Wuthering Heights is an 1847 novel by Emily Brontë, initially published under her pen name Ellis Bell. It concerns two families of the landed gentry living on the West Yorkshire moors, the Earnshaws and the Lintons, and their turbulent relationships with the Earnshaws' foster son, Heathcliff. The novel was influenced by Romanticism and Gothic fiction.

Wuthering Heights is now widely considered to be one of the greatest novels ever written in English, but contemporaneous reviews were polarised. It was controversial for its depictions of mental and physical cruelty, including domestic abuse, and for its challenges to Victorian morality and religious and societal values.

Wuthering Heights was accepted by publisher Thomas Newby along with Anne Brontë's Agnes Grey before the success of their sister Charlotte's novel Jane Eyre, but they were published later. After Emily's death, Charlotte edited a second edition of Wuthering Heights, which was published in 1850. It has inspired an array of adaptations across several media, including English singer-songwriter Kate Bush's song of the same name.

Plot

Opening
In 1801, Mr Lockwood, the new tenant at Thrushcross Grange in Yorkshire, pays a visit to his landlord, Heathcliff, at his remote moorland farmhouse, Wuthering Heights. There he meets a reserved young woman (later identified as Cathy Linton), Joseph, a cantankerous servant, and Hareton, an uneducated fellow, who presents himself as such. Everyone is sullen and inhospitable. Snowed in for the night, Lockwood reads the diary of the former inhabitant of his room, Catherine Earnshaw, and has a nightmare in which a ghostly Catherine begs to enter through the window. Awakened by Lockwood's fearful yells, Heathcliff is troubled.

Lockwood later returns to Thrushcross Grange in heavy snow, falls ill from the cold and becomes bedridden. While he recovers, Lockwood's housekeeper Ellen "Nelly" Dean tells him the story of the strange family.

Nelly's tale 
Thirty years earlier, the Earnshaws live at Wuthering Heights with their children, Hindley and Catherine, and a servant—Nelly herself. Returning from a trip to Liverpool, Earnshaw brings home a young orphan whom he names Heathcliff; Earnshaw treats the boy as his favourite. His own children he neglects, especially after his wife dies. Hindley beats Heathcliff, who gradually becomes close friends with Catherine.

Hindley departs for university, returning as the new master of Wuthering Heights on the death of his father three years later. He and his new wife Frances allow Heathcliff to stay, but only as a servant.

Heathcliff and Catherine spy on Edgar Linton and his sister Isabella, children who live nearby at Thrushcross Grange. Catherine is attacked by their dog, and the Lintons take her in, sending Heathcliff home. When the Lintons visit, Hindley and Edgar make fun of Heathcliff; a fight ensues. Heathcliff is locked in the attic and vows revenge.

Frances dies after giving birth to a son, Hareton. Two years later, Catherine becomes engaged to Edgar. She confesses to Nelly that she loves Heathcliff, and will try to help but cannot marry him because of his low social status. Nelly warns her against the plan. Heathcliff overhears part of the conversation and, misunderstanding Catherine's heart, flees the household. Catherine falls ill, distraught.

Three years after his departure, with Edgar and Catherine having married in the meantime, Heathcliff unexpectedly returns, now a wealthy gentleman. He encourages Isabella's infatuation with him as a means of revenge on Catherine. Enraged by Heathcliff's constant presence at Thrushcross Grange, Edgar cuts off contact. Catherine responds by locking herself in her room and refusing food; pregnant with Edgar's child, she never fully recovers. At Wuthering Heights, Heathcliff gambles with Hindley, who mortgages the property to him to pay his debts. Heathcliff elopes with Isabella, but the relationship fails and they soon return.

When Heathcliff discovers that Catherine is dying, he visits her in secret. She dies shortly after giving birth to a daughter, Cathy, and Heathcliff rages, calling on her ghost to haunt him for as long as he lives. Isabella flees south where she gives birth to Heathcliff's son, Linton. Hindley dies six months later, leaving Heathcliff as master of Wuthering Heights.

Twelve years later, after Isabella's death, the still-sickly Linton is brought back to live with his uncle Edgar at the Grange, but Heathcliff insists that his son must instead live with him. Cathy and Linton (respectively at the Grange and Wuthering Heights) gradually develop a relationship. Heathcliff schemes to ensure that they marry, and on Edgar's death demands that the couple move in with him. He becomes increasingly wild and reveals that on the night Catherine died he dug up her grave, and ever since has been plagued by her ghost. When Linton dies, Cathy has no option but to remain at Wuthering Heights.

Having reached the present day, Nelly's tale concludes.

Ending 
Lockwood grows tired of the moors and moves away. Eight months later he arrives at Wuthering Heights while travelling through the area. He sees Nelly again, who is now the housekeeper at Wuthering Heights. She reports that Cathy has been teaching the still-uneducated Hareton to read. Heathcliff was seeing visions of the dead Catherine; he avoided the young people, saying that he could not bear to see Catherine's eyes, which they both shared, looking at him. He had stopped eating, and some days later was found dead in Catherine's old room.

In the present, Lockwood learns that Cathy and Hareton plan to marry and move to the Grange. Joseph is left to take care of the declining Wuthering Heights. Nelly says that the locals have seen the ghosts of Catherine and Heathcliff wandering abroad together. Lockwood passes by the graves of Catherine, Edgar, and Heathcliff, and is convinced they are finally at peace.

Family tree

Characters 
 Heathcliff is a foundling from Liverpool, who is taken by Mr Earnshaw to Wuthering Heights, where he is reluctantly cared for by the family and spoiled by his adopted father. He and Mr. Earnshaw's daughter, Catherine, grow close, and their love is the central theme of the first volume. His revenge against the man she chooses to marry and its consequences are the central theme of the second volume. Heathcliff has been considered a Byronic hero, but critics have pointed out that he reinvents himself at various points, making his character hard to fit into any single type. He has an ambiguous position in society, and his lack of status is underlined by the fact that "Heathcliff" is both his given name and his surname. The character of Heathcliff may have been inspired by Branwell Brontë. An alcoholic and an opium addict, he would have indeed terrorised Emily and her sister Charlotte during frequent crises of delirium tremens that affected him a few years before his death. Even though Heathcliff has no alcohol or drug problems, the influence of Branwell's character is likely; although the same could be said, perhaps more appropriately, of Hindley Earnshaw and Linton Heathcliff. 
 Catherine Earnshaw: First introduced to the reader after her death, through Lockwood's discovery of her diary and carvings. The description of her life is confined almost entirely to the first volume. She seems unsure whether she is, or wants to become, more like Heathcliff, or aspires to be more like Edgar. Some critics have argued that her decision to marry Edgar Linton is allegorically a rejection of nature and a surrender to culture, a choice with unfortunate, fateful consequences for all the other characters. She dies hours after giving birth to her daughter.
 Edgar Linton: Introduced as a child in the Linton family, he resides at Thrushcross Grange. Edgar's style and manners are in sharp contrast to those of Heathcliff, who instantly dislikes him, and of Catherine, who is drawn to him. Catherine marries him instead of Heathcliff because of his higher social status, with disastrous results to all characters in the story. He dotes on his wife and later his daughter.
 Ellen (Nelly) Dean: The main narrator of the novel, Nelly is a servant to three generations of the Earnshaws and two of the Linton family. Humbly born, she regards herself nevertheless as Hindley's foster-sister (they are the same age and her mother is his nurse). She lives and works among the rough inhabitants of Wuthering Heights but is well-read, and she also experiences the more genteel manners of Thrushcross Grange. She is referred to as Ellen, her given name, to show respect, and as Nelly among those close to her. Critics have discussed how far her actions as an apparent bystander affect the other characters and how much her narrative can be relied on.
 Isabella Linton: Edgar's sister. She views Heathcliff romantically, despite Catherine's warnings, and becomes an unwitting participant in his plot for revenge against Edgar. Heathcliff marries her but treats her abusively. While pregnant, she escapes to London and gives birth to a son, Linton. She entrusts her son to her brother Edgar when she dies.
 Hindley Earnshaw: Catherine's elder brother, Hindley, despises Heathcliff immediately and bullies him throughout their childhood before his father sends him away to college. Hindley returns with his wife, Frances, after Mr Earnshaw dies. He is more mature, but his hatred of Heathcliff remains the same. After Frances's death, Hindley reverts to destructive behaviour, neglects his son, and ruins the Earnshaw family by drinking and gambling to excess. Heathcliff beats Hindley up at one point after Hindley fails in his attempt to kill Heathcliff with a pistol. He dies less than a year after Catherine and leaves his son with nothing.
 Hareton Earnshaw: The son of Hindley and Frances, raised at first by Nelly but soon by Heathcliff. Joseph works to instill a sense of pride in the Earnshaw heritage (even though Hareton will not inherit Earnshaw property, because Hindley has mortgaged it to Heathcliff). Heathcliff, in contrast, teaches him vulgarities as a way of avenging himself on Hindley. Hareton speaks with an accent similar to Joseph's, and occupies a position similar to that of a servant at Wuthering Heights, unaware that he has been done out of his inheritance. He can only read his name. In appearance, he reminds Heathcliff of his aunt, Catherine.
 Cathy Linton: The daughter of Catherine and Edgar Linton, a spirited and strong-willed girl unaware of her parents' history. Edgar is very protective of her and as a result, she is eager to discover what lies beyond the confines of the Grange. Although one of the more sympathetic characters of the novel, she is also somewhat snobbish towards Hareton and his lack of education. She is forced to marry Linton Heathcliff, but after he dies she falls in love with Hareton and they marry.
 Linton Heathcliff: The son of Heathcliff and Isabella. A weak child, his early years are spent with his mother in the south of England. He learns of his father's identity and existence only after his mother dies when he is twelve. In his selfishness and capacity for cruelty he resembles Heathcliff; physically, he resembles his mother. He marries Cathy Linton because his father, who terrifies him, directs him to do so, and soon after he dies from a wasting illness associated with tuberculosis.
 Joseph: A servant at Wuthering Heights for 60 years who is a rigid, self-righteous Christian but lacks any trace of genuine kindness or humanity. He hates nearly everyone in the novel. The Yorkshire dialect that Joseph speaks was the subject of a 1970 book by the linguist K.M. Petyt, who argued that Emily Brontë recorded the dialect of Haworth accurately.
 Mr Lockwood: The first narrator, he rents Thrushcross Grange to escape society, but in the end, decides society is preferable. He narrates the book until Chapter 4, when the main narrator, Nelly, picks up the tale.
 Frances: Hindley's ailing wife and mother of Hareton Earnshaw. She is described as somewhat silly and is obviously from a humble family. Frances dies not long after the birth of her son.
 Mr and Mrs Earnshaw: Catherine's and Hindley's father, Mr Earnshaw is the master of Wuthering Heights at the beginning of Nelly's story and is described as an irascible but loving and kind-hearted man. He favours his adopted son, Heathcliff, which causes trouble in the family. In contrast, his wife mistrusts Heathcliff from their first encounter.
 Mr and Mrs Linton: Edgar's and Isabella's parents, they educate their children in a well-behaved and sophisticated way. Mr Linton also serves as the magistrate of Gimmerton, as his son does in later years.
 Dr Kenneth: The longtime doctor of Gimmerton and a friend of Hindley's who is present at the cases of illness during the novel. Although not much of his character is known, he seems to be a rough but honest person.
 Zillah: A servant to Heathcliff at Wuthering Heights during the period following Catherine's death. Although she is kind to Lockwood, she doesn't like or help Cathy at Wuthering Heights because of Cathy's arrogance and Heathcliff's instructions.
 Mr Green: Edgar's corruptible lawyer who should have changed Edgar's will to prevent Heathcliff from gaining Thrushcross Grange. Instead, Green changes sides and helps Heathcliff to inherit the Grange as his property.

Publication history

1847 edition 
The original text as published by Thomas Cautley Newby in 1847 is available online in two parts. The novel was first published together with Anne Brontë's Agnes Grey in a three-volume format: Wuthering Heights filled the first two volumes and Agnes Grey made up the third.

1850 edition
In 1850 Charlotte Brontë edited the original text for the second edition of Wuthering Heights and also provided it with her foreword. She addressed the faulty punctuation and orthography but also diluted Joseph's thick Yorkshire dialect. Writing to her publisher, W. S. Williams, she said that  Irene Wiltshire, in an essay on dialect and speech, examines some of the changes Charlotte made.

Critical response

Contemporary reviews 
Early reviews of Wuthering Heights were mixed in their assessment. Most critics recognised the power and imagination of the novel, but were baffled by the storyline, and objected to the savagery and selfishness of the characters. In 1847, when the background of an author was given great importance in literary criticism, many critics were intrigued by the authorship of the Bell novels.

The Atlas review called it a "strange, inartistic story", but commented that every chapter seems to contain a "sort of rugged power."

Graham's Lady Magazine wrote: "How a human being could have attempted such a book as the present without committing suicide before he had finished a dozen chapters, is a mystery. It is a compound of vulgar depravity and unnatural horrors".

The American Whig Review wrote: 

Douglas Jerrold's Weekly Newspaper wrote: 

The Examiner wrote: 

The Literary World wrote: 

The English poet and painter Dante Gabriel Rossetti admired the book, writing in 1854 that it was "the first novel I've read for an age, and the best (as regards power and sound style) for two ages, except Sidonia", but, in the same letter, he also referred to it as "a fiend of a book – an incredible monster  [...] The action is laid in hell, – only it seems places and people have English names there".

Twentieth century
Until late in the 19th century "Jane Eyre was regarded as the best of the Brontë sisters' novels". This view began to change in the 1880s with the publication of A. Mary F. Robinson's biography of Emily in 1883.

Modernist novelist Virginia Woolf affirmed the greatness of Wuthering Heights in 1925:
 Wuthering Heights is a more difficult book to understand than Jane Eyre, because Emily was a greater poet than Charlotte. ... She looked out upon a world cleft into gigantic disorder and felt within her the power to unite it in a book. That gigantic ambition is to be felt throughout the novel ... It is this suggestion of power underlying the apparitions of human nature and lifting them up into the presence of greatness that gives the book its huge stature among other novels. 

Similarly, Woolf's contemporary John Cowper Powys referred in 1916 to Emily Brontë's "tremendous vision".

In 1926 Charles Percy Sanger's work on the chronology of Wuthering Heights "affirmed Emily's literary craft and meticulous planning of the novel and disproved Charlotte's presentation of her sister as an unconscious artist who 'did not know what she had done'." However, for a later critic, Albert J. Guerard, "it is a splendid, imperfect novel which Brontë loses control over occasionally".

Still, in 1934, Lord David Cecil, writing in Early Victorian Novelists, commented "that Emily Brontë was not properly appreciated; even her admirers saw her as an 'unequal genius'," and in 1948 F. R. Leavis excluded Wuthering Heights from the great tradition of the English novel because it was "a 'kind of sport'—an anomaly with 'some influence of an essentially undetectable kind.'"

Twenty-first century

Writing in The Guardian in 2003 writer and editor Robert McCrum placed Wuthering Heights at number 17 in his list of 100 greatest novels of all time. And in 2015 he placed it at number 13 in his list of 100 best novels written in English. He said that 

Writing for BBC Culture in 2015 author and book reviewer Jane Ciabattari polled 82 book critics from outside the UK and presented Wuthering Heights as number 7 in the resulting list of 100 greatest British novels.

In 2018 Penguin presented a list of 100 must-read classic books and placed Wuthering Heights at number 71, saying: "Widely considered a staple of Gothic fiction and the English literary canon, this book has gone on to inspire many generations of writersand will continue to do so".

Writing in The Independent journalist and author Ceri Radford and news presenter, journalist, and TV producer Chris Harvey included Wuthering Heights in a list of the 40 best books to read during lockdown. Harvey said that "It's impossible to imagine this novel ever provoking quiet slumbers; Emily Brontë's vision of nature blazes with poetry".

Setting
Novelist John Cowper Powys notes the importance of the setting:
By that singular and forlorn scenery—the scenery of the Yorkshire moors round her home—[Emily Brontë] was, however, in the more flexible portion of her curious nature inveterately influenced. She does not precisely describe this scenery—not at any length ... but it sank so deeply into her that whatever she wrote was affected by it and bears its desolate and imaginative imprint."
Likewise Virginia Woolf suggests the importance of the Yorkshire landscape of Haworth to the poetic vision of both Emily and Charlotte Brontë:

Wuthering Heights is an old house high on the Pennine moorland of West Yorkshire. The first description is provided by Lockwood, the new tenant of the nearby Thrushcross Grange:

Lord David Cecil in Early Victorian Novelists (1934) drew attention to the contrast between the two main settings in Wuthering Heights:

Walter Allen, in The English Novel (1954), likewise "spoke of the two houses in the novel as symbolising 'two opposed principles which … ultimately compose a harmony'". However, David Daiches, "in the 1965 Penguin English Library edition referred to Cecil's interpretation as being 'persuasively argued' though not fully acceptable". The entry on Wuthering Heights in the 2002 Oxford Companion to English Literature, "says that the ending of the novel points to a union of 'the two contrasting worlds and moral orders represented by the Heights and the Grange'".

Inspiration for locations

There is no evidence that either Thrushcross Grange or Wuthering Heights is based on an actual building, but various locations have been speculated as inspirations. Top Withens, a ruined farmhouse in an isolated area near the Haworth Parsonage, was suggested as the model for Wuthering Heights by Ellen Nussey, a friend of Charlotte Brontë. However, its structure does not match that of the farmhouse described in the novel. High Sunderland Hall, near Law Hill, Halifax where Emily worked briefly as a governess in 1838, now demolished, has also been suggested as a model for Wuthering Heights. However, it is too grand for a farmhouse.

Ponden Hall is famous for reputedly being the inspiration for Thrushcross Grange, since Brontë was a frequent visitor. However, it does not match the description given in the novel and is closer in size and appearance to the farmhouse of Wuthering Heights. The Brontë biographer Winifred Gerin believed that Ponden Hall was the original of Wildfell Hall, the old mansion in Anne Brontë's The Tenant of Wildfell Hall. Helen Smart, while noting that Thrushcross Grange has "traditionally been associated with ... Ponden Hall, Stanbury, near Haworth", sees Shibden Hall, Northowram, in Halifax parish, as more likely, referring to Hilda Marsden's article "The Scenic Background of Wuthering Heights".

Point of view 
Most of the novel is the story told by housekeeper Nelly Dean to Lockwood, though the novel uses several narrators (in fact, five or six) to place the story in perspective, or in a variety of perspectives. Emily Brontë uses this frame story technique to narrate most of the story. Thus, for example, Lockwood, the first narrator of the story, tells the story of Nelly, who herself tells the story of another character. The use of a character like Nelly Dean is a literary device, a well-known convention taken from the Gothic novel, the function of which is to portray the events in a more mysterious and exciting manner.

Thus the point of view comes

Critics have questioned the reliability of the two main narrators. The author has been described as sarcastic toward Lockwood, who fancies himself a world-weary romantic but comes across as an effete snob, and there are subtler hints that Nelly's perspective is influenced by her own biases.

The narrative in addition includes an excerpt from Catherine Earnshaw's old diary, and short sections narrated by Heathcliff, Isabella, and another servant.

Influences 

Brontë possessed an exceptional classical culture for a woman of the time. She was familiar with Greek tragedies and was a good Latinist. In addition she was especially influenced by the poets John Milton and William Shakespeare. There are echoes of Shakespeare's King Lear and Romeo and Juliet in Wuthering Heights. 
Another major source of information for the Brontës was the periodicals that their father read, the Leeds Intelligencer and Blackwood's Edinburgh Magazine. Blackwood's Magazine provided knowledge of world affairs and was a source of material for the Brontës' early writing. Emily Brontë was probably aware of the debate on evolution. This debate had been launched in 1844 by Robert Chambers. It raised questions of divine providence and the violence which underlies the universe and relationships between living things.

Romanticism was also a major influence, which included the Gothic novel, the novels of Walter Scott and the poetry of Byron. The Brontës' fiction is seen by some feminist critics as prime examples of Female Gothic. It explores the domestic entrapment and subjection of women to patriarchal authority, and the attempts to subvert and escape such restriction. Emily Brontë's Cathy Earnshaw and Charlotte Brontë's Jane Eyre are both examples of female protagonists in such a role.

According to Juliet Barker, Walter Scott's novel Rob Roy (1817) had a significant influence on Wuthering Heights, which, though "regarded as the archetypal Yorkshire novel ... owed as much, if not more, to Walter Scott's Border country". Rob Roy is set "in the wilds of Northumberland, among the uncouth and quarrelsome squirearchical Osbaldistones", while Cathy Earnshaw "has strong similarities with Diana Vernon, who is equally out of place among her boorish relations" (Barker p. 501).

From 1833 Charlotte and Branwell's Angrian tales began to feature Byronic heroes. Such heroes had a strong sexual magnetism and passionate spirit, and demonstrated arrogance and black-heartedness. The Brontës had discovered Byron in an article in Blackwood's Magazine from August 1825. Byron had died the previous year. Byron became synonymous with the prohibited and audacious.

Romance tradition 

Emily Brontë wrote in the romance tradition of the novel. Walter Scott defined this as "a fictitious narrative in prose or verse; the interest of which turns upon marvellous and uncommon incidents". Scott distinguished the romance from the novel, where (as he saw it) "events are accommodated to the ordinary train of human events and the modern state of society". Scott describes romance as a "kindred term" to novel. However, romances such as Wuthering Heights and Scott's own historical romances and Herman Melville's Moby Dick are often referred to as novels. Other European languages do not distinguish between romance and novel: "a novel is le roman, der Roman, il romanzo, en roman". This sort of romance is different from the genre fiction love romance or romance novel, with its "emotionally satisfying and optimistic ending".
Emily Brontë's approach to the novel form was influenced by the gothic novel.

Gothic novel 
Horace Walpole's The Castle of Otranto (1764) is usually considered the first gothic novel. Walpole's declared aim was to combine elements of the medieval romance, which he deemed too fanciful, and the modern novel, which he considered to be too confined to strict realism.

More recently Ellen Moers, in Literary Women, developed a feminist theory that connects female writers such as Emily Brontë with gothic fiction. Catherine Earnshaw has been identified by some critics as a type of gothic demon because she "shape-shifts" in order to marry Edgar Linton, assuming a domesticity that is contrary to her true nature. It has also been suggested that Catherine's relationship with Heathcliff conforms to the "dynamics of the Gothic romance, in that the woman falls prey to the more or less demonic instincts of her lover, suffers from the violence of his feelings, and at the end is entangled by his thwarted passion". See also the discussion of the daemonic below, under "Religion".

At one point in the novel Heathcliff is thought a vampire. It has been suggested that both he and Catherine are in fact meant to be seen as vampire-like personalities.

Themes

Morality 

Some early Victorian reviewers complained about how Wuthering Heights dealt with violence and immorality. One called it "a compound of vulgar depravity and unnatural horrors".

Emily Brontë was supposedly unaware of "the limits on polite expression" expected of Victorian novelists. Brontë's characters use vulgar language, "cursing and swearing". And though a daughter of a curate, Brontë showed little respect for religion. The only strongly religious character in Wuthering Heights is Joseph who is usually seen as satirizing "the joyless version of Methodism that the Brontë children were exposed to through their Aunt Branwell". A major influence on how Brontë depicts amoral characters was the stories her father Patrick Brontë told, about "the doings" of people around Haworth that his parishioners told him, "stories which 'made one shiver and shrink from hearing' (Charlotte's friend Ellen Nussey reported)", which were "full of grim humour" and violence, stories Emily Brontë took "as a truth".

Shortly after Emily Brontë's death G.H. Lewes wrote in Leader Magazine:

Religion 

Emily Brontë attended church regularly and came from a religious family. Emily "never as far as we know, wrote anything which overtly criticised conventional religion. But she also has the reputation of being a rebel and iconoclast, driven by a spirit more pagan than orthodox Christian". Derek Traversi, for example, sees in Wuthering Heights "a thirst for religious experience,'which is not Christian'. It is this spirit which moves Catherine to exclaim, 'surely you and everybody have a notion that there is, or should be, an existence of yours beyond you. What were the use of my creation if I were entirely contained here?' (Ch. IX)".

Thomas John Winnifrith, author of The Brontes and Their Background: Romance and Reality (Macmillan, 1977), argues that the allusions to Heaven and Hell are more than metaphors, and have a religious significance, because "for Heathcliff, the loss of Catherine is literally Hell ... 'existence after losing her would be Hell' (Ch. xiv, p. 117)." Likewise, in the final scene between them, Heathcliff writhes "in the torments of Hell (XV)".

Daemonic 
The eminent German Lutheran theologian and philosopher Rudolph Otto, author of The Idea of the Holy, saw in Wuthering Heights "a supreme example of 'the daemonic' in literature". Otto links the "daemonic" with "a genuine religious experience". Lisa Wang argues that in both Wuthering Heights, and in her poetry, Emily Brontë concentrates on "the non-conceptual, or what Rudolf Otto has called 'the non-rational' aspect of religion ... the primal nature of religious experience over and above its doctrinal formulations". This corresponds with the dictionary meaning: "of or relating to an inner or attendant spirit, esp. as a source of creative inspiration or genius". This meaning was important to the Romantic movement.

However, the word daemon can also mean "a demon or devil", and that is equally relevant to Heathcliff, whom Peter McInerney describes as "a Satanic Don Juan". Heathcliff is also "dark-skinned", "as dark almost as if it came from the devil". Likewise Charlotte Brontë described him "‘a man's shape animated by demon life – a Ghoul – an Afreet’". In Arabian mythology an "afreet", or ifrit, is a powerful jinn or demon. However, John Bowen believes that "this is too simple a view", because the novel presents an alternative explanation of Heathcliff's cruel and sadistic behaviour; that is, that he has suffered terribly: "is an orphan; ... is brutalised by Hindley; ... relegated to the status of a servant; Catherine marries Edgar". See also: the discussion of the demonic in the section on the gothic novel above; the Byronic hero; and the Romantic hero.

Love 

One 2007 British poll presented Wuthering Heights as the greatest love story of all time. However, "some of the novel's admirers consider it not a love story at all but an exploration of evil and abuse". Helen Small sees Wuthering Heights as being both "one of the greatest love stories in the English language" and at the same time one of the "most brutal revenge narratives". Some critics suggest that reading Wuthering Heights as a love story not only "romanticizes abusive men and toxic relationships but goes against Brontë's clear intent". Moreover, while a "passionate, doomed, death-transcending relationship between Heathcliff and Catherine Earnshaw Linton forms the core of the novel", Wuthering Heights 

"I am Heathcliff" is a frequently quoted phrase from the novel, and "the idea of ... perfect unity between the self and the other is age-old", so that Catherine says that she loves Heathcliff "because he's more myself than I am. Whatever our souls are made of, his and mine are the same" (Chapter IX). Likewise Lord David Cecil suggests that "the deepest attachments are based on characters' similarity or affinity", However Simone de Beauvoir, in her famous feminist work The Second Sex (1949), suggests that when Catherine says "I am Heathcliff": "her own world collapse(s) in contingence, for she really lives in his." (Beauvoir, 1952, p. 725). Beauvoir sees this as "the fatal mirage of the ideal of romantic love ... transcendence .. in the superior male who is perceived as free".

Despite all the passion between Catherine and Heathcliff, critics have from early on drawn attention to the absence of sex. In 1850 the poet and critic Sydney Dobell suggests that "we dare not doubt [Catherine's] purity", and the Victorian poet Swinburne concurs, referring to their "passionate and ardent chastity". More recently Terry Eagleton suggests their relationship is sexless, "because the two, unknown to themselves, are half-siblings, with an unconscious fear of incest".

Childhood 
Childhood is a central theme of Wuthering Heights. Emily Brontë "understands that 'The Child is 'Father of the Man' (Wordsworth, 'My heart leaps up', 1. 7)". Wordsworth, following philosophers of education, such as Rousseau, explored ideas about the way childhood shaped personality. One outcome of this was the German bildungsroman, or "novel of education", such as Charlotte Brontë's Jane Eyre (1847), Eliot's The Mill on the Floss (1860), and Dickens's Great Expectations (1861). Bronte's characters "are heavily influenced by their childhood experiences", though she is less optimistic than her contemporaries that suffering can lead to "change and renewal".

Class and money 
Lockwood arrives at Thrushcross Grange in 1801, a time when, according to Q.D. Leavis, " 'the old rough farming culture, based on a naturally patriarchal family life, was to be challenged, tamed and routed by social and cultural changes' ", At this date the Industrial Revolution was well under way, and was by 1847 a dominant force in much of England, and especially in West Yorkshire. This caused a disruption in "the traditional relationship of social classes" with an expanding upwardly mobile middle-class, which created "a new standard for defining a gentleman", and challenged the traditional criteria of breeding and family and the more recent criterion of character."

Marxist critic Arnold Kettle sees Wuthering Heights "as a symbolic representation of the class system of nineteenth-century England", with its concerns "with property-ownership, the attraction of social comforts", marriage, education, religion, and social status. Driven by a pathological hatred Heathcliff uses against his enemies "their own weapons of money and arranged marriages", as well as "the classic methods of the ruling class, expropriation and property deals".

Later, another Marxist, Terry Eagleton, in Myths of Power: A Marxist Study of the Brontës (1975), further explores the power relationships between "the landed gentry and aristocracy, the traditional power-holders, and the capitalist, industrial middle classes". Haworth in the West Riding of Yorkshire was especially affected by changes to society and its class structure "because of the concentration of large estates and industrial centers" there.

Race 
There has been debate about Heathcliff's race or ethnicity. He is described as a "dark-skinned gypsy" and "a little Lascar", a 19th-century term for Indian sailors, Mr Earnshaw calls him  "as dark almost as if it came from the devil", and Nelly Dean speculates fancifully regarding his origins thus: "Who knows but your father was Emperor of China, and your mother an Indian queen?" Caryl Phillips suggests that Heathcliff may have been an escaped slave, noting the similarities between the way Heathcliff is treated and the way slaves were treated at the time: he is referred to as "it", his name "served him" as both his "Christian and surname", and Mr Earnshaw is referred to as "his owner". Maja-Lisa von Sneidern states that "Heathcliff's racial otherness cannot be a matter of dispute; Brontë makes that explicit", further noting that "by 1804 Liverpool merchants were responsible for more than eighty-four percent of the British transatlantic slave trade." Michael Stewart sees Heathcliff's race as "ambiguous" and argues that Emily Brontë "deliberately gives us this missing hole in the narrative".

Storm and calm 

Lord David Cecil argued for "cosmic forces as the central impetus and controlling force in the novel" and suggested that there is a unifying structure underlying Wuthering Heights: "two spiritual principles: the principle of the storm, ... and the principle of calm", which he further argued were not, "in spite of their apparent opposition", in conflict. Dorothy van Ghent, however, refers to "a tension between two kinds of reality" in the novel: "civilized manners" and "natural energies".

Adaptations

Film and TV 
The earliest known film adaptation of Wuthering Heights was filmed in England in 1920 and was directed by A. V. Bramble. It is unknown if any prints still exist. The most famous is 1939's Wuthering Heights, starring Laurence Olivier and Merle Oberon and directed by William Wyler. This acclaimed adaptation, like many others, eliminated the second generation's story (young Cathy, Linton and Hareton) and is rather inaccurate as a literary adaptation. It won the 1939 New York Film Critics Circle Award for Best Film and was nominated for the 1939 Academy Award for Best Picture.

Nigel Kneale's script was produced for BBC Television twice, firstly in 1953, starring Richard Todd as Heathcliff and Yvonne Mitchell as Cathy. Broadcast live, no recordings of the production are known to exist. The second adaptation using Kneale's script was in 1962, starring Claire Bloom as Catherine and Keith Michell as Heathcliff. This production does exist with the BFI, but has been withheld from public viewing. Kneale's script was also adapted for Australian television in 1959 during a time when original drama productions in the country were rare. Broadcast live from Sydney, the performance was telerecorded, although it is unknown if this kinescope still exists.

In 1958, an adaptation aired on CBS television as part of the series DuPont Show of the Month starring Rosemary Harris as Cathy and Richard Burton as Heathcliff. The BBC produced a four-part television dramatisation in 1967 starring Ian McShane and Angela Scoular.

Les Hauts de Hurlevent is a French mini-series in six 26-minute episodes, in black and white, created and directed by Jean-Paul Carrère based on the eponymous novel by Emily Brontë, and broadcast between 1964 and 1968 on the first ORTF channel.
The 1970 film with Timothy Dalton as Heathcliff is the first colour version of the novel. It has gained acceptance over the years although it was initially poorly received. The character of Hindley is portrayed much more sympathetically, and his story-arc is altered. It also subtly suggests that Heathcliff may be Cathy's illegitimate half-brother.

In 1978, the BBC produced a five-part TV serialisation of the book starring Ken Hutchinson, Kay Adshead and John Duttine, with music by Carl Davis; it is considered one of the most faithful adaptations of Emily Brontë's story.

There is also a 1985 French film adaptation, Hurlevent by Jacques Rivette, and a 1988 Japanese film adaptation, Wuthering Heights (1988 film).

The 1992 film Emily Brontë's Wuthering Heights starring Ralph Fiennes and Juliette Binoche is notable for including the oft-omitted second generation story of the children of Cathy, Hindley and Heathcliff.

More recent film or TV adaptations include ITV's 2009 two-part drama series starring Tom Hardy, Charlotte Riley, Sarah Lancashire, and Andrew Lincoln, and the 2011 film starring Kaya Scodelario and James Howson and directed by Andrea Arnold.

Adaptations which place the story in a new setting include the 1954 adaptation, retitled Abismos de Pasion, directed by Spanish filmmaker Luis Buñuel and set in Catholic Mexico, with Heathcliff and Cathy renamed Alejandro and Catalina. In Buñuel's version Heathcliff/Alejandro claims to have become rich by making a deal with Satan. The New York Times reviewed a re-release of this film as "an almost magical example of how an artist of genius can take someone else's classic work and shape it to fit his own temperament without really violating it," noting that the film was thoroughly Spanish and Catholic in its tone while still highly faithful to Brontë. Yoshishige Yoshida's 1988 adaptation also has a transposed setting, this time to medieval Japan. In Yoshida's version, the Heathcliff character, Onimaru, is raised in a nearby community of priests who worship a local fire god. Filipino director Carlos Siguion-Reyna made a film adaptation titled Hihintayin Kita sa Langit (1991). The screenplay was written by Raquel Villavicencio and produced by Armida Siguion-Reyna. It starred Richard Gomez as Gabriel (Heathcliff) and Dawn Zulueta as Carmina (Catherine). It became a Filipino film classic.

In 2003, MTV produced a poorly reviewed version set in a modern California high school.

Wuthering High, a 2015 TV Movie shown on Lifetime, is set in Malibu, California. 

The 1966 Indian film Dil Diya Dard Liya is based upon this novel. The film is directed by Abdul Rashid Kardar and Dilip Kumar. The film stars Dilip Kumar, Waheeda Rehman, Pran, Rehman, Shyama and Johnny Walker. The music is by Naushad. Although it did not fare as well as other movies of Dilip Kumar, it was well received by critics.

In 2022, Emma Mackey starred in a biopic of Emily Brontë in Emily. The film charts the life of Brontë and the inspiration she gained for writing Wuthering Heights living in the Yorkshire countryside.

Theatre
The novel has been adapted as operas composed by Bernard Herrmann, Carlisle Floyd, and Frédéric Chaslin (most cover only the first half of the book) and a musical by Bernard J. Taylor.

In 2021, Emma Rice directed a theatrical version which was shown online and at the Bristol Old Vic.,this production was then put on at the National Theatre in 2022.

Works inspired by Wuthering Heights

Literature 
Mizumura Minae's A True Novel (2002) is inspired by Wuthering Heights and might be called an adaptation of the story in a post-World War II Japanese setting.

In Jane Urquhart's Changing Heaven, the novel Wuthering Heights, as well as the ghost of Emily Brontë, feature as prominent roles in the narrative.

In her 2019 novel, The West Indian, Valerie Browne Lester imagines an origin story for Heathcliff in 1760s Jamaica.

K-Ming Chang's 2021 chapbook Bone House was released by Bull City Press as part of their Inch series. The collection functions as a queer Taiwanese-American retelling of Wuthering Heights, in which an unnamed narrator moves into a butcher's mansion "with a life of its own."

Canadian author Hilary Scharper's ecogothic novel Perdita (2013) was deeply influenced by Wuthering Heights, namely in terms of the narrative role of powerful, cruel and desolate landscapes.

The poem "Wuthering" (2017) by Tanya Grae uses Wuthering Heights as an allegory.

Maryse Condé's Windward Heights (1995) is a reworking of Wuthering Heights set in Cuba and Guadeloupe at the turn of the 20th century, which Condé stated she intended as an homage to Brontë.

In 2011, a graphic novel version was published by Classical Comics. It was adapted by Scottish writer Sean Michael Wilson and hand painted by comic book veteran artist John M Burns. This version, which stays close to the original novel, was shortlisted for the Stan Lee Excelsior Awards.

Music
Kate Bush's 1978 song "Wuthering Heights" is most likely the best-known creative work inspired by Brontë's story that is not properly an "adaptation". Bush wrote and released the song when she was 18 and chose it as the lead single in her debut album. It was primarily inspired by the 1939 Olivier–Oberon film, which deeply affected Bush in her teenage years. The song is sung from Catherine's point of view as she pleads at Heathcliff's window to be admitted. It uses quotations from Catherine, both in the chorus ("Let me in! I'm so cold!") and the verses, with Catherine admitting she had "bad dreams in the night". Critic Sheila Whiteley wrote that the ethereal quality of the vocal resonates with Cathy's dementia, and that Bush's high register has both "childlike qualities in its purity of tone" and an "underlying eroticism in its sinuous erotic contours". Singer Pat Benatar covered the song in 1980 on her "Crimes of Passion" album. Brazilian heavy metal band Angra released a version of Bush's song on its debut album Angels Cry in 1993. A 2018 cover of Bush's "Wuthering Heights" by EURINGER adds electropunk elements.

Wind & Wuthering (1976) by English rock band Genesis alludes to the Brontë novel not only in the album's title but also in the titles of two of its tracks, "Unquiet Slumbers for the Sleepers..." and "...In That Quiet Earth". Both titles refer to the closing lines in the novel.

Songwriter Jim Steinman said that he wrote the 1989 song "It's All Coming Back to Me Now" "while under the influence of Wuthering Heights". He said that the song was "about being enslaved and obsessed by love" and compared it to "Heathcliff digging up Kathy's corpse and dancing with it in the cold moonlight".

The 2008 song "Cath..." by indie rock band Death Cab for Cutie was inspired by Wuthering Heights.

References

Bibliography

Editions

Journal articles 
Maynard, John . "The Brontës and religionn", in The Cambridge Companion to the Brontës, edited by Glen, Heather, Cambridge: Cambridge University Press, 2007, pp. 92–213.
McInerney, Peter (1980), "Satanic conceits in Frankenstein and Wuthering Heights", Nineteenth Century Contexts, 4:1, 1-15
 Rahman, Tahmina S., "The Law of the Moors- A legal analysis of Wuthering Heights ". UCL Jurisprudence Review. 2000 

 Tytler, Graeme, "The Role of Religion in Wuthering Heights". Brontë Studies, 32:1, (2007) pp. 41-5

Books

External links 

 Wuthering Heights at the British Library
 
 .
 
 Reader's Guide to Wuthering Heights
  – including 110 records of editions of Wuthering Heights

 
1847 British novels
1840s fantasy novels
British Gothic novels
Victorian novels
British novels adapted into films
Novels by Emily Brontë
Fiction about suicide
British novels adapted into television shows
Novels set in Yorkshire
Works published under a pseudonym
Novels set in the 18th century
Novels set in the 1800s
Fiction set in 1801
Fiction with unreliable narrators
Frame stories
Novels about revenge
Novels adapted into operas
Novels adapted into ballets
Love stories
1840s debut novels
Nonlinear narrative novels
Ghost novels